Pokémon 2.B.A. Master is a 1999 album, the first soundtrack album released for the English localization of the Pokémon anime.

Production
In an interview with John Loeffler, it was revealed that it took three and a half weeks to produce the entire album.

Reception
The album has sold over three million copies worldwide.

In popular culture
Shortened versions of select songs are played in the "Pikachu's Jukebox" segment during the show's first two seasons.
Instrumental versions of the album's songs make up the soundtrack to the 2000 video game Pokémon Puzzle League.
Some songs from the album were used in the musical Pokémon Live!
Comedian Brian David Gilbert created and performed a rewritten and extended Pokérap, including a vast majority of Pokémon from every generation that had been released at the time. He described this theatrical piece as a "Gesamtkunstwerk".

Track list

Chart performance

Weekly charts

Year-end charts

Sales and certifications

References

Songs from Pokémon
1999 soundtrack albums
Anime soundtracks
Television soundtracks
E1 Music soundtracks
Songs about fictional characters